Perfect Commando (also known as Californian Commando) is a Finnish television comedy series that premiered on Elisa Viihde network on 13 February 2020. It is directed by Jalmari Helander, and stars Kian Lawley and Katherine Hughes.

Synopsis
Perfect Commando tells the story of Vantaa "Van" Hamilton (Lawley), who travels from California to his mother's homeland Finland with his girlfriend Rachel (Hughes), but their paths differ in Helsinki Airport due to a system error related to Van's background, and Van suddenly finds himself in the Finnish Defence Forces training as a commando into the middle of nowhere, while Rachel ends up living in Helsinki with Van's Finnish cousin who maintains a rap band with friends.

Production
The series is partly spoken in English and partly in Finnish. The army scenes of the series are mainly filmed in the former garrison of Keuruu, Finland.

References

External links
 Perfect Commando in Elisa Viihde (in Finnish)
 

Finnish comedy television series
Television shows set in Finland
Television shows set in California